Bowery Boy is a 1940 American comedy film directed by William Morgan and written by Robert Chapin, Harry Kronman and Eugene Solow. The film stars Dennis O'Keefe, Louise Campbell, Jimmy Lydon, Helen Vinson, Roger Pryor and Paul Hurst. The film was released on December 27, 1940, by Republic Pictures.

Plot

Cast 
Dennis O'Keefe as Dr. Tom O'Hara
Louise Campbell as Anne Cleary
Jimmy Lydon as Sock Dolan
Helen Vinson as Peggy Winters
Roger Pryor as J. R. Mason
Paul Hurst as Blubber Mullins
Edward Gargan as Mr. Hanson
Selmer Jackson as Dr. Crane
John Kelly as Battler
Howard Hickman as Dr. Axel Winters
Frederick Burton as Dr. George Winters
Jack Carr as Flops

References

External links
 

1940 films
American comedy films
1940 comedy films
Republic Pictures films
Films directed by William Morgan (director)
American black-and-white films
1940s English-language films
1940s American films